Glenbrook is a residential neighbourhood in the southwest quadrant of Calgary, Alberta. It is bounded by 26 Avenue S to the north, 37 Street W to the east, Richmond Road to the south and Sarcee Trail to the west.

The land was partly annexed to the City of Calgary in 1954, and partly in 1956. Glenbrook was established in 1958. It is represented in the Calgary City Council by the Ward 6 councillor.

Demographics

Residents in this community had a median household income of $42,845 in 2000, and there were 23.3% low income residents living in the neighbourhood. As of 2000, 20.5% of the residents were immigrants. A proportion of 35.6% of the buildings were condominiums or apartments, and 46.1% of the housing was used for renting.

Education
The community is served by A.E. Cross Junior High, Glenbrook Elementary public schools and Calgary Christian, St. Gregory Elementary-Junior High (4-9) and St. Thomas Aquinas Elementary (K-3)  (Catholic schools).

See also
List of neighbourhoods in Calgary

References

External links
Glenbrook Community Association

Neighbourhoods in Calgary